The Anthem of the Khanty-Mansi Autonomous Okrug is the anthem of the Khanty-Mansi Autonomous Okrug, a federal subject of Russia. It is one of the national symbols of the Khanty-Mansi Autonomous Okrug along with its flag and coat of arms. It was written by Alexander Radchenko with music by Radchenko and Viktor Khudoley and was officially adopted in 2004.

Lyrics

See also 
Flag of Khanty-Mansi Autonomous Okrug

References 

Russian anthems
Regional songs
European anthems
Khanty-Mansi Autonomous Okrug
National anthem compositions in F major